The Algeicras-Bobadilla railway was built by the Algeciras Gibraltar Railway Company, the first section of track was laid on 1 September 1888. The first locomotive was built by Beyer, Peacock & Company in Manchester, England. A 1st class return ticket from Gibraltar to Ronda was set at 17.10 Pesetas.

History
The Algeciras-Bobadilla railway was built for the benefit of British officers stationed in Gibraltar wanting to travel to Spain and the rest of Europe. To avoid offending Spanish sensitivities, the line was built concluding in Algeciras, a town in Spain on the opposite side of the Bay of Gibraltar, rather than at the Gibraltar border. Despite it having no direct connection to the European railway network at the time, a chapter was devoted to Gibraltar in the 1913 guidebook.

So impressed were the inhabitants of Algeciras that they named two streets after people related to the project: one after John Morrison a Scottish engineer ("Juan Morrison"), and one after Alexander Henderson, who had funded the project.

Current situation
In 2019 Spanish government progressed plans to renovate the ageing infrastructure of the line at an estimated cost of €159 million.

See also
Algeciras railway station
Bobadilla railway station
Rail transport in Gibraltar

References

Railway lines in Spain
Rail transport in Andalusia
Rail transport in Gibraltar
Railway lines opened in 1888
1888 establishments in Spain